Saffron is a spice.

Saffron may also refer to:

 Saffron (trade), the business of producing and selling saffron
 Saffron (color), a shade of orange-yellow
 Saffron (album), a 2010 album by Ron Contour and Factor
 Saffron (singer) (born 1968), lead singer of Republica
 Saffron Brand Consultants, a design firm and consultant
 Saffron Type System, a font-rendering technology used in Adobe Flash
 Saffron (Ranma ½), a character in Ranma ½
 Saffron Monsoon, a character in Absolutely Fabulous
 Saffron, a minor character in the Firefly universe
 Saffron, a character in the video game Super Paper Mario

People with the given name
 Saffron Aldridge (born 1968), English fashion model, freelance journalist and social activist
 Saffron Barker (born 2000), English internet personality
 Saffron Burrows (born 1972), British actress
 Saffron Coomber (born 1994), English actress
 Saffron Herndon (born 1967), American comedian
 Saffronn Te Ratana (born 1975), New Zealand visual artist

See also
 Ministry of States and Frontier Regions (Pakistan) (SAFRON), a federal ministry in Pakistan
 Nishan Sahib
 Saffron Revolution, the 2007 Burmese anti-government protests
 The Saffron Swastika, a 2001 book by Koenraad Elst
 Saffron terror, militant Hindu nationalism
 Saffron Walden, a town in Essex, England, named after the spice
 Saffronisation, a symbol of Hindu nationalism in Indian politics
 Safran
 Sannyasa or renunciation of the worldly in Hinduism
 Theravada Buddhism 
 Zunfthaus zur Saffran